The Fair Food Program (FFP) is a legally binding agreement between the Florida Tomato Growers and the Coalition of Immokalee Workers (CIW). It aims to provide Florida’s tomato workers with better wages and working conditions. The program has a list of six elements in order to ensure social responsibility and to create a strong partnership between workers, growers and buyers. The Fair Foods Standards Council (FFSC) oversees the program and ensures that standards are upheld. Big companies, including Taco Bell and Walmart have pledged to pay a penny more per pound of tomatoes and buy only from growers who comply with the program.

Partners

Coalition of Immokalee Workers
The Fair Food Program emerged from the Coalition of Immokalee Workers' Campaign for Fair Food. The campaign was launched in 2001 by farmworkers in Immokalee, Florida.

Fair Food Standards Council
The Fair Food Standards Council (FFSC) oversees the program and ensures that standards are upheld. Judge Laura Safer Espinoza, a retired New York State Supreme Court Justice is the Executive Director of the FFSC.

Background

In 2005, after the CIW boycotted Taco Bell for almost four years, the company agreed to sign a Fair Food Agreement, committing the company to pay a “penny more per pound” on its tomatoes, to be passed on as wage bonus to tomato harvesters, and to work with CIW to improve conditions in the fields. College campuses were a major impetus for this agreement; twenty-two colleges banned Taco Bell from operating. The CIW then targeted McDonald’s for two years; in 2007, McDonald's signed a Fair Food Agreement with CIW. Other fast-food chains and food retailers followed suit.

Despite this success, in 2007, the Florida Tomato Growers, which is the state’s largest tomato producer, slowed the CIW’s progress. They threatened farms with $100,000 worth of fines if they passed through "penny per pound" monies. In 2010, Pacific Tomato Growers and Lipman, two of the nation’s largest producers, signed on to the program, effectively ending the industry boycott. Just months later, the Florida Tomato Growers Exchange signed onto the Fair Food Program, which began widespread implementation of the model.

Walmart joined the Fair Food Program on January 16, 2014. The company sells 20% of the United States’ fresh tomatoes. Walmart additionally agreed to help  expand the Program outside of Florida and expand into other crops.

Implementation and expansion

The Fair Food Program has completed four year of implementation across the Florida tomato industry as well as its first year of expansion to Florida-based tomato growers’ operations in Georgia, North and South Carolina, Virginia, Maryland and New Jersey. The program is currently expanding to strawberries and green bell peppers in Florida. The Fair Food Standards Council publishes detailed metrics annually, charting the program's implementation.

Success
From November 2011 through September 2015, farmworkers have brought forth over 1100 complaints. The FFSC has conducted more than 120 audits, interviewed 12,000 workers and completed 45 site visits. The CIW has conducted 400 education sessions, which has educated 35,000 workers about their rights. Buyers have paid nearly $20 million in the Fair Food Premium, which goes directly to workers as a line-item bonus on their paychecks.  According to the CIW, “today, virtually all Florida tomato growers have joined the Fair Food Program.” "'When I first visited Immokalee, I heard appalling stories of abuse and modern slavery,' said Susan L. Marquis, dean of the Pardee RAND Graduate School, a public policy institution in Santa Monica, Calif. 'But now the tomato fields in Immokalee are probably the best working environment in American agriculture. In the past three years, they’ve gone from being the worst to the best.'"  ”

Fair Food label
The CIW is developing a consumer-facing "Fair Food Label" to help promote the program in supermarkets.

Response

The Roosevelt Institute awarded the CIW its 2013 Freedom from Want Medal in 2013. 
After an investigation from PBS’s Frontline for all of 2013, they declared the FFP to be the “single most effective prevention program in the U.S. agricultural industry.”
The President’s Advisory Council on Faith-Based and Neighborhood Partnerships reported that the FFP was one of the “most successful and innovative programs” to prevent modern slavery. 
In May 2013, a delegation from the UN visited the Fair Food Program stakeholders and announced that the program had successfully created, “ market incentives for participating growers.”
A Washington Post article stated that the “CIW model is one of the great human rights success stories of our day. ”

Participating buyers
Ahold USA, Aramark, Bon Appétit Management Co., Burger King, Chipotle Mexican Grill, Compass Group, Sodexo, The Fresh Market, McDonald's, Subway, Trader Joe’s, Walmart, Whole Foods Market, and Yum Brands.

Participating growers
Ag-Mart Produce, DiMare Homestead, DiMare Ruskin, Gargiulo, Gulfstream Tomato Packers, Harllee Packing, Kern Carpenter Farms, Lady Moon Farms, Lipman Produce, Pacific Tomato Growers, Taylor and Fulton Packing, Tomatoes of Ruskin, and West Coast Tomato/McClure Farms

References

Contract law
Human trafficking in the United States
Standards of the United States